Muhammad Duta Atapelwa (born 28 January 2001) is an Indonesian professional footballer who last played as a defender for Liga 1 club Persita Tangerang.

Club career

Persita Tangerang
He was signed for Persita Tangerang to play in Liga 1 in the 2021 season. Atapelwa made his first-team debut on 18 November 2021 as a substitute in a match against Bhayangkara at the Maguwoharjo Stadium, Sleman.

Career statistics

Club

Notes

References

External links
 Duta Atapelwa at Soccerway
 Duta Atapelwa at Liga Indonesia

2001 births
Living people
Indonesian footballers
Liga 1 (Indonesia) players
Persita Tangerang players
Association football defenders
People from Tangerang
Sportspeople from Banten